Yeinny Norela Geles Moreno (born 6 December 1997) is a Colombian weightlifter. She is a two-time medalist at the Pan American Weightlifting Championships. She won two medals at the 2022 Bolivarian Games held in Valledupar, Colombia.

She competed in the girls' +63 kg event at the 2014 Summer Youth Olympics held in Nanjing, China.

She won the bronze medal in her event at the 2022 South American Games held in Asunción, Paraguay.

Achievements

References

External links 
 

Living people
1997 births
Colombian female weightlifters
Weightlifters at the 2014 Summer Youth Olympics
Pan American Weightlifting Championships medalists
South American Games bronze medalists for Colombia
South American Games medalists in weightlifting
Competitors at the 2022 South American Games
21st-century Colombian women
People from Antioquia Department